Mahawar Vaishya is a category of Marwari Bania caste of the Hindu religion. Mostly based in Alwar, Gurugram,
Jaipur, Mathura, Mandi Govind Garh, Rewari, Hasanpur and also across India and abroad. They believe in Hinduism, Vaishnav and Sanatan Dharma and are called Vaishnav Bania. They are not devotees of a single god but believe in multiple gods. They are usually vegetarian and avoid consuming alcohol.

History 
Mahawars has history as old as Lord Krishna, as there are many historic evidence exists for the existence of Mahawars during Lord Krishna's time both while in Mathura UP and in Dwarika Gujarat.

Mostly based in:
 Alwar and Jaipur District of Rajasthan
 Mathura District of Uttar Pradesh
 Sitapur District of Uttar Pradesh  
 Mandi Govind Garh], [Jalandhar in Punjab
 Gurugram, Rewari of Haryana
 Haldaur of Uttar Pradesh
 Also across India and abroad

Disambiguation 
There is another community which also used surname as Mahawar and known as Mahawar Koli. The Mahawar Koli are mainly found in Rajasthan in cities like
 Ajmer
 Jaipur
 Kota
 Sawaimadhopur
 Dausa
 Alwar
 Kaurali
 Bharatpur

References

Vaishya community
Social groups of Rajasthan
Bania communities